Mulvane USD 263 is a public unified school district headquartered in Mulvane, Kansas, United States.  The district includes the communities of Mulvane, Peck, and nearby rural areas.

Schools
The school district operates the following schools:
 Mulvane High School
 Mulvane Middle School
 Mulvane Grade School
 Munson Primary School

See also
 List of high schools in Kansas
 List of unified school districts in Kansas
 Kansas State Department of Education
 Kansas State High School Activities Association

References

External links
 

School districts in Kansas
Education in Sedgwick County, Kansas